The Definitive Collection is the latest of many greatest hits albums by the funk/R&B group Cameo. It emphasizes the band's hits from the 1980s, similar to the European release Classic Cameo. A more comprehensive collection can be found in the 2005 release, Gold.

Track listing
 "Word Up!" – Blackmon/Jenkins
 "Single Life" – Blackmon/Jenkins
 "Candy" – Blackmon/Jenkins
 "She's Strange" – Blackmon/Jenkins/Leftenant/Singleton
 "Sparkle" – Blackmon/Lockett
 "I Just Want to Be" – Blackmon/Johnson
 "Shake Your Pants" – Blackmon
 "Rigor Mortis" – Blackmon/Leftenant/Leftenant
 "Attack Me with Your Love" – Blackmon/Kendrick
 "Back and Forth" – Blackmon/Jenkins/Kendrick/Leftenant
 "Why Have I Lost You" [Version 2] – Blackmon
 "Flirt" –  Blackmon/Jenkins
 "Skin I'm In" [Single version] – Blackmon
 "Talkin' Out the Side of Your Neck" – Blackmon/Jenkins/Leftenant/Singleton
 "Keep It Hot" – Blackmon/Lockett
 "Freaky Dancin'" – Blackmon/Jenkins
 "Just Be Yourself" – Blackmon/Jenkins/Singleton

Cameo (band) compilation albums
2006 greatest hits albums
Mercury Records compilation albums